Elf-Man is a direct-to-video Christmas family comedy film starring Jason Acuña as the title character. It is distributed by Anchor Bay Entertainment and was released in United States, the United Kingdom, Australia and New Zealand on December 4, 2012.  Worldwide sales by Vision Films.

Plot
When Santa Claus leaves an Elf behind on Christmas Eve, the Harper kids help him realize that he's the super-hero: "Elf-Man". Together they must save their Dad's new invention from a bumbling gang of thieves, and enjoy the best Christmas ever.

Cast
Jason "Wee Man" Acuña as Elf-Man
Jeffrey Combs as Mickey
Mackenzie Astin as Eric
Mirelly Taylor as Amy
Carly Robell as Kasey
Blake Kaiser as Ryan
Marty Terry as Grandma
 Dave Coyne as Jean-Pierre
Larry Nichols as Big Bucket

Reception
Tracy Moore of Common Sense Media gave the film 2 out of 5 stars, calling it a "poor man's Home Alone" and "a watered-down version of the many better adventures that have come before it".

See also
 List of Christmas films

References

External links
 
 
 

2012 films
2010s Christmas comedy films
American Christmas comedy films
Films directed by Ethan Wiley
Films with screenplays by Ethan Wiley
Films about elves
2012 comedy films
2010s English-language films
2010s American films